The Bohemian Quartet (known as the Czech Quartet after 1918) was a Czech string quartet of international repute that was founded in 1891 and disbanded in 1933.

Origins 
The Quartet was founded in Prague by three pupils of Antonín Bennewitz (Karel Hoffmann, Josef Suk and Oskar Nedbal) and a pupil of Hanuš Wihan (Otakar Berger); Bennewitz and Wihan were both teachers at the Prague Conservatory. Wihan had himself studied at Prague, and was cellist of the chamber quartet of Ludwig II in Munich, becoming Professor at Prague in 1888. He replaced his student Otakar Berger as cellist in the quartet when Berger died prematurely. Wihan then directed the Quartet until 1913 when the strain of touring obliged him to retire from it and resume his teaching. His place was then taken by Ladislav Zelenka (b. 1881), who since 1911 had been playing with the Ševčík-Lhotský Quartet. In 1906, the violist Nedbal had run off with Hoffmann's wife; during the tour in England, his place was at short notice taken by Lionel Tertis and afterwards formally by Jeří Herold. The group made repeated tours in Europe, especially with the quartets of Dvořák and Smetana, and were noted for their warm tone and fiery rhythms. In 1922 the four members were appointed professors at the Prague Conservatory. The group disbanded with a concert on 4 December 1933, to honour Suk’s 60th birthday.

Many key contemporary works were written for and/or first performed by the Bohemian Quartet. Most notably, this included works by Antonín Dvořák and Leoš Janáček, such as Janáček's second string quartet, subtitled "Intimate Letters".

Personnel 
1st violin
 Karel Hoffmann
 
2nd violin
 Josef Suk (to 1933)
 Stanislav Novák (1933–34)

Viola
 Oskar Nedbal (to 1906)
 Jiří Herold (1906–1934)

Violoncello
 Otto Berger (to 1894)
 Hanuš Wihan (1894–1914)
 Ladislav Zelenka (1914–1934)

Recordings 
 Smetana: Quartet no. 1 in E minor (1876) (Polydor 78rpm, 95076-95079). (as 'Bohemian Quartet')
 Smetana: Quartet no. 2 in D minor (1882) (Pathé 78rpm X 86005-86008) (Private recording for Czech Academy).
 Dvořák: Quartet no 6 in F major op 96 (Polydor 78rpm, 95084-95086). (as 'Bohemian (Suk) Quartet')
 Dvořák: Quartet no 3 in E flat major op 51, Dumka only (Polydor 78rpm, 95087).(ditto)
 Suk: Quartet no 1 in B major op 11 (Polydor 78rpm, 95080-95083).

References

Further reading 
 A. Eaglefield-Hull, A Dictionary of Modern Music and Musicians (Dent, London 1924).
 -. Boleska, Ten Years of the Czech Quartet (M. Urbánek, Prague 1902).
 J.R. Bennett, Smetana on 3000 Records (Oakwood Press 1974).
 R.D. Darrell, The Gramophone Shop Encyclopedia of Recorded Music (New York 1936).

See also

External links 
 

Musical groups established in 1891
Czech string quartets
1891 establishments in Austria-Hungary